Josh Davis (born December 11, 1980) is a former American football wide receiver who played in the National Football League (NFL). He was signed by the Miami Dolphins in 2005. He played college football at Marshall University.

Davis has also been a member of the New Orleans Saints, the Minnesota Vikings and the Carolina Panthers.

High school career
Before attending Marshall University, Davis was a Wide Receiver at York Comprehensive High School. He was the All Region football player of the year his Sophomore, Junior and Senior year. He was also the Special Teams player of the year his Sophomore, Junior and Senior year. Davis was the Offensive player of the year his senior year and was selected and awarded as one of the top 100 football players in South Carolina. In addition, he lettered in basketball his Freshman, Sophomore, Junior and Senior year. Davis lettered in track for the 100 yard meter for the state of South Carolina. He took first place in the 100-yard dash in the State Championship and second place in the 200 yard dash in the Upper State Championship. He successfully attended Fork Union Military Academy after High School and was selected and participated in the North South Shrine game. While at Fork Union Davis had an incredible career as a Wide Receiver - coached by John Shuman.

College career
Davis graduated from Marshall University in Huntington, WV. He was selected for Freshman football All-American Team. Davis broke the NCAA record for receptions as a freshman. He was ranked second in NCAA history for career receptions, ranked first in the Mid-American Conference for career receptions and was also ranked in the top 5 for receiving yards in the MAC. Davis made first-team All-MAC as a Freshman, Sophomore, Junior and Senior. He was selected and participated in the East-West Shrine game. Davis was the MVP for the 2004 Fort Worth Bowl game.

Davis was awarded and selected as one of the top 100 Black Legend athletes at Marshall University and awarded Offensive player of the game several times throughout his collegiate career.

Professional career
Davis was a wide receiver and punt returner for the Miami Dolphins, New Orleans Saints, Minnesota Vikings, and Carolina Panthers. He was also an outstanding wide receiver in the NFL Europe for the Hamburg Sea Devils in Germany. Davis was part of the legendary team who won the World Bowl in 2007 during the last NFL Europe football season. In 2017 he was inducted into the York County Sports Hall of Fame. In 2018 he was inducted into the Marshall University Athletics Hall of Fame.

References

External links
Carolina Panthers bio

1980 births
Living people
African-American players of American football
American football wide receivers
Carolina Panthers players
Hamburg Sea Devils players
Marshall Thundering Herd football players
Miami Dolphins players
Minnesota Vikings players
New Orleans Saints players
People from York County, South Carolina
21st-century African-American sportspeople
20th-century African-American people